The 2007 Amsterdam Admirals season was the 13th and final season for the franchise in the NFL Europa League (NFLEL). The team was led by head coach Bart Andrus in his seventh year, and played its home games at Amsterdam ArenA and Olympisch Stadion in Amsterdam, Netherlands. They finished the regular season in fifth place with a record of four wins and six losses. The National Football League (NFL) announced the closure of its European branch on June 29, ending the Admirals' 13-year existence.

Offseason

Free agent draft

Personnel

Staff

Roster

Schedule

Standings

Game summaries

Week 1: at Frankfurt Galaxy

Week 2: vs Rhein Fire

Week 3: at Berlin Thunder

Week 4: vs Frankfurt Galaxy

Week 5: at Hamburg Sea Devils

Week 6: vs Hamburg Sea Devils

Week 7: vs Cologne Centurions

Week 8: at Rhein Fire

Week 9: at Cologne Centurions

Week 10: vs Berlin Thunder

Notes

References

Amsterdam
Amsterdam Admirals seasons